Live at CBGB's is an official live recording by the band VAST and was released in 2006. It was made available as an online download.

Track listing
"Intro" – 1:45
"Turquoise" – 3:19
"Here" – 3:52
"Pretty When You Cry" – 3:50
"Falling from the Sky" – 3:14
"Thrown Away" – 4:01
"Touched" – 4:24
"I Don't Have Anything" – 3:21
"I Can't Say No (To You)" – 3:48
"That's My Boy" – 4:06
"The Last One Alive" – 3:57
"Free" – 3:15
"Desert Garden" – 3:26
"Tattoo of Your Name" – 3:31
"You're Too Young" – 3:02
"Temptation" – 3:27

References

VAST albums
2006 live albums
Albums recorded at CBGB